While many languages have numerous dialects that differ in phonology, the contemporary spoken Arabic language is more properly described as a continuum of varieties. This article deals primarily with Modern Standard Arabic (MSA), which is the standard variety shared by educated speakers throughout Arabic-speaking regions. MSA is used in writing in formal print media and orally in newscasts, speeches and formal declarations of numerous types.

Modern Standard Arabic has 28 consonant phonemes and 6 vowel phonemes or 8 or 10 vowels in most modern dialects. All phonemes contrast between "emphatic" (pharyngealized) consonants and non-emphatic ones. Some of these phonemes have coalesced in the various modern dialects, while new phonemes have been introduced through borrowing or phonemic splits. A "phonemic quality of length" applies to consonants as well as vowels.

Vowels

Modern Standard Arabic has six vowel phonemes forming three pairs of corresponding short and long vowels. Modern Standard Arabic has two diphthongs (formed by a combination of short  with the semivowels  and ). Allophony in different dialects of Arabic can occur and is partially conditioned by neighboring consonants within the same word. The following are some general rules:

 
 only in Iraq and the Persian Gulf:  before a word boundary;
 labial consonants (and ),
 pharyngeal consonants ( and )
 glottal consonants ( and )
 
Sometimes with one value for each vowel in both short and long lengths or two different values for each short and long lengths. They can be distinct phonemes in loanwords for a number of speakers.
Unstressed final long  are most often shortened or reduced:  → ,  → ,  → .

However, the actual rules governing vowel-retraction are a good deal more complex and have relatively little in the way of an agreed-upon standard, as there are often competing notions of what constitutes a "prestige" form. Often, even highly proficient speakers will import the vowel-retraction rules from their native dialects. Thus, for example, in the Arabic of someone from Cairo, emphatic consonants will affect every vowel between word boundaries, whereas certain Saudi speakers exhibit emphasis only on the vowels adjacent to an emphatic consonant. Certain speakers (most notably Levantine speakers) exhibit a degree of asymmetry in leftward vs. rightward spread of vowel-retraction.

The final heavy syllable of a root is stressed.

For example, لون ('color') is generally pronounced  in Mashriqi dialects but  in most Maghrebi Arabic.

Foreign words often have a liberal sprinkling of long vowels, as their word shapes do not conform to standardized prescriptive pronunciations written by letters for short vowels. In general, the pronunciation of loanwords is highly dependent on the speaker's native variety.

Consonants

Even in the most formal of conventions, pronunciation depends upon a speaker's background. Nevertheless, the number and phonetic character of most of the 28 consonants has a broad degree of regularity among Arabic-speaking regions. Note that Arabic is particularly rich in uvular, pharyngeal, and pharyngealized ("emphatic") sounds. The emphatic coronals (and ) cause assimilation of emphasis to adjacent non-emphatic coronal consonants. The phonemes  ⟨پ⟩ and  ⟨ڤ⟩ (not used by all speakers) are not considered to be part of the phonemic inventory, as they exist only in foreign words and they can be pronounced as  ⟨ب⟩ and  ⟨ف⟩ respectively depending on the speaker.

Note: the table and notes below discusses the phonology of Modern Standard Arabic among Arabic speakers and not regional dialects.

Long (geminate or double) consonants are pronounced exactly like short consonants, but last longer. In Arabic, they are called mushaddadah ("strengthened", marked with a shaddah). Between a long consonant and a pause, an epenthetic  occurs, but this is only common across regions in West Asia.

Phonotactics
Standard Arabic syllables come in only five forms:
 C V (light)
 C V V (heavy)
 C V C (heavy)
 C V V C (super-heavy)
 C V C C (super-heavy)

Arabic syllable structure does not allow syllables to start with a vowel or with a consonant cluster.

In the pausal form, the final geminates behave as a single consonant, only when preceding another word or with vocalization, the geminates start appearing, belonging to two separate syllables.

Loanwords can break some phonotactic rules like allowing initial consonant clusters (with an initial epenthetic [i] being optional) like in /bluː.toː/ "Pluto" or allowing CVVC syllables non-finally without geminates like in /ruːs.jaː/ "Russia" which can be modified to /ruː.si.jaː/ to fit the phonotactics better.

Word stress

The placement of word stress in Arabic varies considerably from one dialect to another, and has been the focus of extensive research and debate.

In determining stress, Arabic distinguishes three types of syllables:

 Light:
 An open syllable containing a short vowel (i.e. CV), such as wa 'and'
 Heavy:
 An open syllable containing a long vowel (i.e. CVV), such as sā.fara 'he travelled'
 A closed syllable containing a short vowel followed by one consonant (i.e. CVC), such as min 'from' or ka.tab.tu 'I wrote'
 Super-heavy:
 A closed syllable containing a long vowel followed by one consonant (i.e. CVVC), such as bāb# 'door' or mād.dun 'stretching (NOM)'
 A closed syllable containing a short vowel followed by two consonants (i.e. CVCC), such as bint# 'girl', or a long vowel followed by a geminate consonant (i.e. CVVCiCi), such as mādd# 'stretching'

The word stress of Classical Arabic has been the subject of debate. However, there is consensus as to the general rule, even though there are some exceptions. A simple rule of thumb is that word-stress falls on the penultimate syllable of a word if that syllable is closed, and otherwise on the antepenultimate.

A more precise description is J. C. E. Watson's. Here the stressed syllable follows the marker ' and variant rules are in brackets:

Modern Arabic dialects all maintain rules (1) and (2). But if there is neither a final superheavy syllable nor a heavy penultimate syllable, their behaviour varies. Thus in Palestinian, rule (3) is instead 'otherwise stress the first syllable (up to the antepenult):  ‘he wrote’,  ‘man’', whereas the basic rules of Cairene (to which there are exceptions) are:

Local variations of Modern Standard Arabic

Spoken varieties differ from Classical Arabic and Modern Standard Arabic not only in grammar but also in pronunciation. Outside of the Arabian peninsula, a major linguistic division is between sedentary, largely urban, varieties and rural varieties. Inside the Arabian peninsula and in Iraq, the two types are less distinct; but the language of the urbanized Hejaz, at least, strongly looks like a conservative sedentary variety.

Some examples of variation:

 Consonants

In Modern Standard Arabic (not in Egypt's use),  is used as a marginal phoneme to pronounce some dialectal and loan words.

The phoneme represented by the Arabic letter  has many standard pronunciations:  in most of the Arabian Peninsula and as the predominant pronunciation of Literary Arabic outside the Arab world,  in most of Egypt and some regions in southern Yemen and southwestern Oman. This is also a characteristic of colloquial Egyptian and southern Yemeni dialects.

The use of both sounds may be considered marginal and Arabs may pronounce the words interchangeably; besides, many loanwords have become Arabized, e.g.  or   "Pakistan",  or   "virus".

Egyptian Arabic treats  as two consonants and inserts , as [C] or [C], when it occurs before or after another consonant.  is found as normal in Iraqi Arabic and Gulf Arabic. Otherwise Arabic usually substitutes other letters in the transliteration of names and loanwords like the Persian character  which is used for writing .

Other Variations include:
 Split of original  into two phonemes, distinguished primarily by how they affect neighboring vowels. This has progressed the farthest in North Africa. See Moroccan Arabic, Algerian Arabic, Tunisian Arabic and Libyan Arabic
 Loss of the glottal stop in places where it is historically attested, as in  → .

 Vowels

The more extreme distinctions are characteristic of sedentary varieties, while Bedouin and conservative Arabian-peninsula varieties have much closer allophones. In some of the sedentary varieties, the allophones are gradually splitting into new phonemes under the influence of loanwords, where the allophone closest in sound to the source-language vowel often appears regardless of the presence or absence of nearby emphatic consonants.
 Spread of "emphasis", visible in the backing of phonemic . In conservative varieties of the Arabic peninsula, only  adjacent to emphatic consonants is affected, while in Cairo, an emphatic consonant anywhere in a word tends to trigger emphatic allophones throughout the entire word. Dialects of the Levant are somewhere in between.
See Lebanese Arabic.
 Loss of final short vowels (with  sometimes remaining), and shortening of final long vowels. This triggered the loss of most Classical Arabic case and mood distinctions.
 Collapse and deletion of short vowels. Arabic varieties everywhere have a tendency to delete short vowels (especially other than ) in many phonological contexts. When combined with the operation of inflectional morphology, disallowed consonant clusters often result, which are broken up by epenthetic short vowels, automatically inserted by phonological rules. Classical Arabic words borrowed into Moroccan Arabic are pronounced entirely with "full" vowels regardless of the length of the original vowel.

Phonologies of different Arabic dialects

 Grayed ones are also standard pronunciations.

Cairene

The Arabic of Cairo (often called "Egyptian Arabic" or more correctly "Cairene Arabic") is a typical sedentary variety and a de facto standard variety among certain segments of the Arabic-speaking population, due to the dominance of Egyptian media. Cairene has also merged the interdental consonants with the dental plosives (e.g. ثلاثة  → , 'three') except in loanwords from Classical Arabic where they are nativized as sibilant fricatives (e.g. ثانوية  → , 'secondary school'). Cairene also has  as a marginal phoneme from loanwords from languages other than Classical Arabic.

Sanaa

Varieties such as that of Sanaa, Yemen, are more conservative and retain most phonemic contrasts of Classical Arabic. Sanaani possesses  as a reflex of Classical  (which still functions as an emphatic consonant).

Distribution
The frequency distribution of the 28 consonant phonemes, based on the 2,967 triliteral roots listed by Wehr is (with the percentage of roots in which each phoneme occurs):

This distribution does not necessarily reflect the actual frequency of occurrence of the phonemes in speech, since pronouns, prepositions and suffixes are not taken into account, and the roots themselves will occur with varying frequency. In particular,  occurs in several extremely common affixes (occurring in the marker for second-person or feminine third-person as a prefix, the marker for first-person or feminine third-person as a suffix, and as the second element of Forms VIII and X as an infix) despite being fifth from last on Wehr's list. The list does give, however, an idea of which phonemes are more marginal than others.

Sample
The Literary Arabic sample text is a reading of The North Wind and the Sun by a speaker who was born in Safed, lived and was educated in Beirut from age 8 to 15, subsequently studied and taught in Damascus, studied phonetics in Scotland and since then has resided in Scotland and Kuwait.

Normal orthographic version

Diacriticized orthographic version

Phonemic transcription (with i‘rāb)

Phonemic transcription (without i‘rāb)

Phonetic transcription (Egypt)

ALA-LC transliteration

English Wiktionary transliteration (based on Hans Wehr)

English Translation
The North Wind and the Sun were disputing which was the stronger, when a traveler came along wrapped in a warm cloak. They agreed that the one who first succeeded in making the traveler take his cloak off should be considered stronger than the other. Then the North Wind blew as hard as he could, but the more he blew the more closely did the traveler fold his cloak around him; and at last the North Wind gave up the attempt. Then the Sun shined out warmly, and immediately the traveler took off his cloak. And so the North Wind was obliged to confess that the Sun was the stronger of the two.

References

Bibliography

 
 

 
 
 
 Hans Wehr, (1952) Arabisches Wörterbuch für die Schriftsprache der Gegenwart
 
 
 
 
 
 
 
 

 
 
 

 
Arabic language